Mary Graham may refer to:
Lady Mary Tudor (1673–1726), married name Mary Graham, daughter of Charles II of Great Britain
Mary Margaret Graham, United States Deputy Director of National Intelligence for Collection, 2005–2008
Mary Lou Graham (born 1936), former batgirl and relief pitcher in the All-American Girls Professional Baseball League
Mary Graham (writer), American writer and academic
Mary Henrietta Graham, first black woman to be admitted to, and first black person to graduate from, the University of Michigan
Molly Graham (Mary Allan Graham, 1880–1950), Scottish golfer
Mary Graham (camogie), participated in 1965 All-Ireland Senior Camogie Championship